Ponerorchis camptoceras (synonym Neottianthe camptoceras) is a species of plant in the family Orchidaceae. It is endemic to the Sichuan region of China.

Taxonomy
The species was first described in 1892 as Habenaria camptoceras by William Botting Hemsley, who attributed the name to Robert Allen Rolfe. In 1919, Friedrich Rudolf Schlechter transferred the species to Neottianthe (having slightly earlier placed it in Gymnadenia). A molecular phylogenetic study in 2014 found that species of Neottianthe, Amitostigma and Ponerorchis were mixed together in a single clade, making none of the three genera monophyletic as then circumscribed. Neottianthe and Amitostigma were subsumed into Ponerorchis, with this species becoming Ponerorchis camptoceras.

References

camptoceras
Endangered plants
Plants described in 1892
Endemic orchids of China
Taxonomy articles created by Polbot
Taxobox binomials not recognized by IUCN